Katıralanı is a village in Dikili district of İzmir Province, Turkey.  It is situated to the south of Dikili.  The population of the village is 156  as of 2011.

References

Villages in Dikili District